A total solar eclipse occurred on July 18, 1860. A solar eclipse occurs when the Moon passes between Earth and the Sun, thereby totally or partly obscuring the image of the Sun for a viewer on Earth. A total solar eclipse occurs when the Moon's apparent diameter is larger than the Sun's, blocking all direct sunlight, turning day into darkness. Totality occurs in a narrow path across Earth's surface, with the partial solar eclipse visible over a surrounding region thousands of kilometres wide.

Coronal Mass Ejection 
The first coronal mass ejection may have been observed as coronal loops progressing during this total eclipse.

Related eclipses 
It is a part of solar Saros 124.

Tritos series

See also
Solar storm of 1859

References

 NASA chart graphics
 Googlemap
 NASA Besselian elements
 Sketch of Solar Corona 1860 July 18
 Russia expedition for solar eclipse of July 18, 1860
 

1860 07 18
1860 in science
1860 07 18
July 1860 events